The Dungeon Master is a text-based role-playing video game written by Graham Stafford for the ZX Spectrum and published by Crystal Computing in 1983.

The player can create dungeons in an underground labyrinth and venture into them with a lone adventurer, searching for turquoise rings. The player moves from room to room fighting monsters, picking up equipment, and gaining levels.

Reception 

The game was well received when it was released.

References

External links 

1983 video games
Europe-exclusive video games
Role-playing video games
Video games developed in the United Kingdom
ZX Spectrum games
ZX Spectrum-only games